よ, in hiragana or ヨ in katakana, is one of the Japanese kana, each of which represents one mora. The hiragana is made in two strokes, while the katakana in three. Both represent [].

When small and preceded by an -i kana, this kana represents a palatalization of the preceding consonant sound with the  vowel (see yōon).

Stroke order

Other communicative representations

 Full Braille representation

 The yōon characters ょ and ョ are encoded in Japanese Braille by prefixing "-o" kana (e.g. Ko, So) with a yōon braille indicator, which can be combined with the "Dakuten" or "Handakuten" braille indicators for the appropriate consonant sounds.

 Computer encodings

References

See also

 Yori (kana)

Specific kana